Al-Falah Housing Society is a neighbourhood in the Korangi District in eastern Karachi, Pakistan. It was previously part of Shah Faisal Town, which was an administrative unit that was disbanded in 2011.

Alfalah Society is striped residential area aside by Railway lines, starts from Malir Halt to Malir No.15 Stop (Malir Court), There are several ethnic groups in Shah Faisal Town including Muhajirs, Sindhis, Punjabis, Kashmiris, Seraikis, Pakhtuns, Balochis, Memons, Bohras, Ismailis, etc. Over 99% of the population is Muslim. The population of Shah Faisal Town is estimated to be nearly one million.

There is a railway station "Malir Station" the residents of the town access this the junction to catch trains for their en route. Jamia Millia Education Institution in This Area, also various Eating Places located there i.e. "Khaiber Hotel Malir 15, Gevini Restaurant"

See also
 Rafi Bungalows
 Aswan Town  
 Anwar e Ibraheem
 Salman Garden & Terrace
 Jamia Milla Education Institution
 Al-Falah Blocks A-B
 Al-Falah Blocks C-CC-D & D extension
 Al-Falah Blocks E-F-G-H
 Anum Homes
 Anum Flats at Jamia Millia Stop 
 Ibrahim Villas Phase 1
 Shadbagh Housing Project
 Gulistan-e-malir
 Moinabad

References

External links 
 Karachi Website

Neighbourhoods of Karachi
Shah Faisal Town